The 2001 Cup of Russia was the fifth event of six in the 2001–02 ISU Grand Prix of Figure Skating, a senior-level international invitational competition series. It was held at the Ice Palace in Saint Petersburg on November 22–25. Medals were awarded in the disciplines of men's singles, ladies' singles, pair skating, and ice dancing. Skaters earned points toward qualifying for the 2001–02 Grand Prix Final. The compulsory dance was the Ravensburg Waltz.

Results

Men
Plushenko tried to complete a quadruple Lutz but fell in his winning free skating.

Ladies

Pairs

Ice dancing

References

External links
 https://web.archive.org/web/20120324011458/http://ww2.isu.org/news/gprus3.pdf
 2001 Cup of Russia

Cup of Russia
Cup of Russia
Rostelecom Cup